Sipan Hamo is a Syrian Democratic Forces commander. In October 2017, he travelled to Russia to meet with Russian Defense Minister Sergey Shoygu and Chief-of-Staff Valeria Gerasimov over the future of Deir ez-Zour and Raqqa. Hamo was the highest SDF officer to travel to Russia since the beginning of the Syrian civil war In February 2018, Hamo commented on Russian laissez-faire regarding  Turkey's Operation Olive Branch entering SDF-held Afrin canton, stating that Russia was making a strategic mistake.

References

See also 
 Syrian Democratic Forces
 Battle of Raqqa (2017)
 Battle of Afrin

Living people
Syrian Democratic Forces
Year of birth missing (living people)